Berkley is an unincorporated community in Harford County, Maryland, United States. Rigbie House was listed on the National Register of Historic Places in 1973.

References

Unincorporated communities in Harford County, Maryland
Unincorporated communities in Maryland